Dendrophryniscus carvalhoi is a species of toad in the family Bufonidae.

It is endemic to Brazil.
Its natural habitat is subtropical or tropical moist lowland forests.
It is threatened by habitat loss.

Sources

Dendrophryniscus
Endemic fauna of Brazil
Amphibians described in 1994
Taxonomy articles created by Polbot